Retribution (stylized in all caps) was a group of professional wrestling characters who performed in the WWE for the Raw brand. The group, led by Mustafa Ali, featured Mace, Slapjack, T-Bar, Reckoning, and Retaliation. The heel team were first portrayed on television in August 2020, disbanding in March the following year.

In the group's early months, masked henchman appeared on Raw, being presented as a group of spurned performers whose goal was to destroy the company. They made their debut on August 3, 2020, then fully masked; the identities of most members would be revealed on September 21, with Ali revealed as the group's previously unseen leader on October 5. The team disbanded at Fastlane in March 2021 after Mace and T-Bar rebelled against Ali.

From its debut to its dissolution, Retribution was consistently met with negative reaction from critics, fans and industry figures. Although the performers were considered talented, their booking, attires, ring names and personas were all critically panned, being referred to as "hideous" and "hastily thrown together." Some critics considered the group irrevocably doomed from the beginning, being damaging to the careers of its members. The group also won the Gooker Award for the worst wrestling event of 2020 according to WrestleCrap.

History 

On the August 3, 2020, episode of Raw, lights in the WWE Performance Center began flickering on and off and a masked group of vigilantes set fire to a generator. Four days later, on the August 7 episode of SmackDown, members attacked the announcers and the audience. The group would end their attack by using a chainsaw to cut the ring ropes down. As the weeks progressed, the group began to explain their actions, referring to perceived unfair treatment as they came up through the WWE system, and the desire to upend said system.

On the September 21 episode of Raw, it was revealed that NXT wrestlers Dominik Dijakovic, Dio Maddin, Shane Thorne, Mercedes Martinez, and Mia Yim were the primary members of the stable, being subsequently revealed as going under the new ring names of T-Bar, Mace, Slapjack, Retaliation, and Reckoning respectively. That same night, T-Bar, Mace, and Slapjack made their in-ring debut against The Hurt Business (Bobby Lashley, Shelton Benjamin, and Cedric Alexander) in the main event, losing by disqualification. On the October 5 episode of Raw, Mustafa Ali was revealed as the leader of the stable as he ordered them to attack The Hurt Business during his match with MVP. Shortly thereafter, Martinez requested her removal from the group, and was quietly returned to NXT. On the October 19 episode of Raw, Retribution lost a 4 vs 4 tag team match to the Hurt Business after T-Bar submitted to Lashley's Full Nelson. Afterwards, they all would be attacked by "The Fiend" Bray Wyatt.

At the Hell in a Cell Kickoff Show, Mustafa Ali challenged any member of The Hurt Business to face one member of Retribution. On the main show, MVP confirmed that Bobby Lashley would face off against Slapjack. All members of each faction were not allowed to be present at ringside and it was a WWE United States Championship match. Bobby Lashley then defeated Slapjack to retain the United States Championship. Retribution then attacked Lashley, but retreated when the rest of The Hurt Business came. On the October 26 episode of Raw, Ali, T-Bar, Mace and Slapjack competed in a 4 on 4 elimination tag team match against The Hurt Business, losing by disqualification after Ali hit Alexander with a chair.

Retribution picked up their first win in WWE, defeating Keith Lee, Braun Strowman, Sheamus and Riddle of Raw's Survivor Series team on the November 16, 2020 edition of Raw, with Ali pinning Riddle. On November 17, Retribution (kayfabe) hacked the WWE Twitter account  and released a set of Twitter fleets of members T-Bar, Mace, Slapjack and Reckoning explaining their motives for being in the group. On the November 26th edition of Main Event, Retribution appeared as a guest on Miz TV explaining their motives and attacked The Gobbledy Gooker. They then began feuding with Ricochet with every member defeating him in singles matches in order to try to convince him to join their group. However, Ricochet would reject their offer. Following this, Retribution began feuding with The New Day with Ali targeting Kofi Kingston for taking his spot in the Elimination Chamber which led to KofiMania. On the February 22, 2021 episode of Raw, after T-Bar and Mace lost a tag team match to New Day, the first signs of a potential split occurred when Ali began to show frustration, criticizing the whole group for having lost the majority of their matches. The team disbanded at the Fastlane Kickoff Show, where Reckoning and Slapjack walked out on Ali, then T-Bar and Mace double chokeslammed him after he lost a match for the United States Championship to Riddle.

After the group dissolved, Ali formed a tag team with Mansoor, while Mace & T-Bar continued on as a tag team, still using the Retribution aesthetic. Reckoning and Slapjack would not return to WWE television, however as part of the 2021 Draft the former was referred to by her previous ring name, Mia Yim, effectively dropping her Retribution persona. In the 2021 WWE Draft, Mace and T-Bar were split up, as T-Bar stayed on Raw as Mace was Drafted to SmackDown, disbanding the team. Martinez, Yim, and Thorne were subsequently released from their WWE contracts in 2021 but Yim returned a year later aligning with AJ Styles and The O.C., after a one year hiatus. Since the group dissolved Dijak, who was T-bar, returned to NXT on the October 25 episode of NXT as a vignette was shown of T-Bar's Retribution mask being tossed into a fire, teasing his return under the group's Retribution Style gimmick of Vigilante Justice

Reception 
Retribution met with immediate mockery upon their debut in August 2020. Pro Wrestling Torch journalist Zack Heydorn felt the group did not deliver on WWE's preceding hype, saying "Nothing about Retribution's current presentation screams danger, fear, or evil. They are like gnats that presumably could get swatted away with a flick of the wrist." Adam Silverstein of CBSSports.com wrote of the group's second appearance "Mostly, they just jumped around and yelled, 'Yeah!' like a bunch of teenagers making trouble after school. It is clear this faction was rushed and not thought out well. Perhaps next week with a new set of tapings there will be a clearer direction, but right now, it's terrible." Shortly after their debut, Blake Oestriecher of Forbes.com reported that the group had received widespread criticism from WWE fans on social media who noted the similarities between Retribution and the Antifa movement in the United States, though WWE stated that the group was not meant to be political in nature.

Negative critical response would continue over the next few months. Kevin Berge of Bleacher Report commented on the group's "awful" identity reveal: "Retribution took charge of the September 21 edition of Monday Night Raw. While this had potential to change many people's perception of the group, instead the entire night fell woefully flat. Retribution came out in goofy masks... Talented stars are lost in an angle that may never recover." PWTorch reporter Frank Peteani called Retribution a "hideous angle on many levels", and suggested that the stable's fan interaction on social media may be an effort to mitigate the negative audience response. Dave LaGreca, host of Sirius XM's Busted Open, found WWE's awarding contracts to the outlaw group to be nonsensical.

In October, Sean Ross Sapp of Fightful noted that the group had faced unfavorable comparisons to The Dark Order of All Elite Wrestling (AEW), and called it "a hastily thrown together project after Vince McMahon was repeatedly questioned about declining viewership, lack of creative direction and an absence of new stars." He lambasted the storyline, writing, "The rollout of Retribution sucked... It didn't make any sense, and really still doesn't. Why were they allowed in the venue? Why weren't they arrested?" During a November Q&A, PWInsiders Dave Scherer was asked if Retribution can recover, to which he said, "They have been booked sooooo badly I don't think they can ever be more than just there." Scherer lamented that Ali, being the only member not to have his "[identity] mostly hidden", will "have permanent stink on him". On another Q&A in December, Scherer said that the faction was "a bunch of losers [...] They have totally blown that whole faction. It's epically bad." In 2021, Retribution was voted by Wrestling Observer Newsletters readers as the second Worst Character, behind Bray Wyatt.

Retribution's presentation has also received negative reactions from past and present industry figures. Former World Championship Wrestling (WCW) announcer Mark Madden and AEW wrestler Chris Jericho expressed confusion as to why WWE would hire the faction, with the former saying that "wrestling can be so stupid sometimes". Retired wrestler CM Punk joked that the mask worn by Slapjack was a consequence of his being "bored in catering" near "an abundance of paper plates". Former WCW and WWE executive Eric Bischoff also commented "Could you possibly screw up an invasion storyline any more in such a short period of time?"

Fightful reported that they had discussed the stable with several WWE talents: the members' ring names were unanimously criticized, with one wrestler likening them to "something out of a bad movie or [video] game". A female talent lamented the casting of Martinez and Yim as Retribution members, saying that those women were "facing a battle to not make this look as dumb as it is". Following Martinez (Retaliation)'s sudden removal from the group, retired wrestler Lance Storm called her a "survivor", and suggested she would be "breathing a sigh of relief". Former WWE creative writer Vince Russo was critical of Retribution "for looking like a bunch of kids running around the neighborhood causing hi-jinks like Dennis The Menace". Former WWE writer Andrew Goldstein commented that the idea of the gimmick was flawed. "If you're going to name an infiltrating group 'RETRIBUTION', you need to have a thesis in your promos. There needs to be some sort of grievance that you're fighting against, and they've yet to name a grievance." He also commented that if it was written to contain recently released performers there would be a reason to support the group."

Awards and accomplishments 
 WrestleCrap
 Gooker Award (2020)

References

External links 
 
 
 
 
 

Masked tag teams
WWE teams and stables